Milesiina is a subtribe of syrphid flies in the family Syrphidae. There are at least 14 described species in Milesiina.

Genera
Hemixylota Williston, 1882
Milesia Latreille, 1804
Spilomyia Meigen, 1803
Stilbosoma Philippi, 1865
Syrittosyrphus Hull, 1944

References

Eristalinae
Brachycera tribes